Slapton is a small village in Northamptonshire, England, about  from Towcester and the same from Silverstone. It is close to the A43 road which links the M40 motorway junction 10 with the M1 junction 15A at Northampton. Central London is about 60 miles south of M40 junction 10. At the 2011 Census the population remained less than 100 and was included in the civil parish of Whilton.

The village's name means 'farm/settlement which is slippery' or 'farm/settlement which is muddy'.

Governance
Slapton is represented on Woodend Parish Council. Prior to local government changes in 2021 it formed part of the Blakesley & Cote ward of South Northants District Council. The village was in the area of Northamptonshire County Council.

The current Parliamentary Constituency is Daventry. However, for the 2010 General Election there are boundary changes. The Boundary Commission originally retained the parish in the revised Daventry constituency, but after consultation with local residents the village was moved into the new South Northamptonshire constituency. Both Daventry and South Northamptonshire constituencies are considered safe Conservative seats.

Landmarks
The parish church is dedicated to Saint Botolph and dates from the early to mid-13th century; it was described by Pevsner as "memorably intimate". There are wall paintings dating from the 14th and 15th centuries, restored in 1971.

There is a Methodist chapel dated 1844.

On the road from Bradden there are three houses of c.1600 and another of 1775.

References

External links

Villages in Northamptonshire
West Northamptonshire District